Larne railway station  may refer to:
Larne Harbour railway station
Larne Town railway station